The 2020 European Road Cycling Championships was the 26th running of the European Road Cycling Championships that took place from 24 to 28 August 2020 in Plouay, France. The event consisted of a total of 6 road races and 7 time trials.

Location
On 10 June 2019, it was announced that Trentino, Italy would host this event from 9 to 13 September 2020. However, due to the COVID-19 pandemic in Italy, the UEC and Trentino officials decided to postpone the city's hosting of the event to 2021. It was later announced in July that Plouay, France would step up to host the event from 24 to 28 August 2020, with the city also hosting the French National Road Race and Time Trial Championships the week prior, as well as the Bretagne Classic and GP de Plouay – Bretagne on 25 and 26 August, respectively.

Race Schedule
All times are in CEST (UTC+2).

Elite

Under-23

Junior

Mixed Team Relay

Overall medal table

References

External links 
 UEC 2020 Road European Championships

European Road Championships by year
European Road Championships, 2020
Road
European Road Championships